Spargaloma is a monotypic moth genus in the family Erebidae. Its only species is Spargaloma sexpunctata, the six-spotted gray. Both the genus and species were first described by Augustus Radcliffe Grote in 1873. It is found from coast to coast in lower Canada south in the east to Florida, Mississippi and Arkansas, in the west to California.

The wingspan is 25–29 mm. Adults are on wing from May to September. There is one generation in the north and two or more in Connecticut and southern Ohio.

The larvae feed on the underside of the leaf blades of Apocynum species.

References

Boletobiinae
Moths of North America
Monotypic moth genera